The First of Us (stylized as: EL PR1MERO DE NOSOTROS) is an Argentine telenovela produced by Viacom International Studios that premiered on 21 March 2022 on Telefe. It is written by Ernesto Korovsky and Romina Moretto, and directed by Pablo Vásquez and Pablo Ambrosino. It stars Benjamín Vicuña, Paola Krum, Luciano Castro, Jorgelina Aruzzi, Damián de Santo and Mercedes Funes.

Plot
The story focuses on the life of a group of friends, who are in their 40s and undergo a great change when they find out that one of them, Santiago (Benjamín Vicuña), suffers from a terminal illness, after having experienced the first symptom at a dinner. and be cared for in hospital. From there, the news leaves everyone shocked, putting them in close proximity to death, which moves them deeply and keeps them restless.

Cast

Main
 Benjamín Vicuña as Santiago Luna
 Paola Krum as Jimena Rauch
 Luciano Castro as Nicolás Torres
 Jorgelina Aruzzi as Valeria Perell
 Damián de Santo as Ignacio "Nacho" Reinoso
 Mercedes Funes as Soledad González

Recurring
 Daniel Fanego as Ernesto "Ernie" Luna
 Rafael Ferro as Martín Hermida
 Carola Reyna as Karina Pereyra
 Adriana Salonia as Mariana Herrera
 Nicolás Riera as Cristian García
 Sebastián Presta as Gustavo Sanguinetti
 Noralíh Gago as Margarita Litardo
 Karina Hernández as Raquel Russo
 Rocío Gómez Wlosko as Uma Luna
 José Giménez Zapiola as Pedro Reinoso
 Federico Pezet as Nahuel Reinoso
 Valentino Casado as Matías Sanguinetti
 Fernanda Metilli as Sofía
 Agustín García Moreno as Agustín

Guest

Episodes

Reception

Critical response
The debut season of The First of Us received positive responses from critics. According to Emanuel Respighi of Página 12, the telenovela "has a deep story, which escapes the comedy of manners, mature in its genesis, trigger and development, a fiction that invites viewers to enter a dimension of human existence with the strange paradox of celebrating life". In a review for Clarín, Graciela Guiñazú wrote: "is one of those dramas that make us lump in throat" with a solid cast and described the plot as "a story in which it is sensed that love, fears, humor, doubts and hope will sustain the inevitable outcome".

References

External links
 The First of Us on Telefe
 

2022 telenovelas
Argentine telenovelas
2022 Argentine television series debuts
2022 Argentine television series endings
Telefe original programming
Spanish-language telenovelas
Spanish-language television shows